Lauren Delany (born 17 June 1989) is an Irish rugby player from Shankill, Dublin. She plays for Sale Sharks and the Ireland women's national rugby union team. She works as a sports nutritionist.

Club career 
Delany represented Ireland at basketball and only took up rugby at age 25, when she moved to England to do a master's degree. Her first club was Bletchley Ladies, then she moved to Waterloo Ladies who play in England's Premier 15s.

In August 2020 she joined Sale Sharks.

International career 
Delany was recruited by the Irish Rugby Football Union  IQrugby (Irish-qualified) system which identifies talent outside of Ireland. Ireland manager Adam Griggs saw her first playing in an IQrugby trial in England in 2018.

In 2018 she made her debut for the Ireland women's national rugby union team in an Autumn international v USA rugby. She made her Women's Six Nations debut, at full-back, against England in 2019 and was Ireland's starting full-back for every game of the 2019 Women's Six Nations.

Moved to the wing in 2020, she scored her first Six Nations try, against Wales, in the 2020 Women's Six Nations.

She played on the right wing for Ireland in the 2021 Women's Six Nations.

Personal life 
Delany went to school in Colaiste Iosagain in Dublin, an all-girls school where the main sports were basketball and ladies gaelic football. She competed in the Basketball Ireland Women's Superleague with Meteors Basketball Club and played for Ireland up to U23 level, including the European U16 Championships (2005).

She has a degree in human nutrition and dietetics from the University of Dublin (Trinity College), a post-grad from Dublin Institute of Technology, a Masters in Science (Sport and Exercise Nutrition) from Loughborough University in England and is studying for a PhD at Leeds Beckett University.

She lives in Manchester. Her work, with the English Institute of Sport, has seen her advising several of British sport's high performance units and Olympic sports (cycling, badminton, archery, taewondo and swimming) and she also advises the Leeds Rhinos on  performance nutrition.

Honours

References

External links 

Living people
Sportswomen
1989 births
Women in sports